The grapheme Ȓ (lower case ȓ) is a letter used in discussion of Serbo-Croatian phonology. The diacritical mark is an inverted breve or arch.

References

Latin letters with diacritics
Phonetic transcription symbols